Coming Back (귀로 - Gwiro) is a 1967 South Korean film directed by Lee Man-hee. It was chosen as Best Film at the Grand Bell Awards.

Plot
A melodrama about the wife of a handicapped war-veteran writer. Their marriage is tested when the wife is tempted by a romance with a younger man.

Cast
Kim Jin-kyu as Choe Dong-u
Moon Jung-suk as Ji-yeon
Jeon Gye-hyeon as Choe I-yeong

Bibliography

Contemporary reviews
August 5, 1967. "「[영화단평] 영육 갈등 여심의 방황, <귀로>」". The Dong-a Ilbo.

References

External links

1967 films
1960s Korean-language films
Best Picture Grand Bell Award winners
South Korean drama films
Films directed by Lee Man-hee (director)